Épinay-sur-Orge (literally Épinay on Orge) is a commune in the Essonne department in Île-de-France in northern France.

Geography
The town is located on a plateau overlooking three rivers:
the Rouillon flows from West to East along the North side of the town and into the Yvette;
the Yvette flows from North to South past the East of the town and into the Orge at the point where the three communes of Épinay-sur-Orge, Villemoisson-sur-Orge, and Savigny-sur-Orge meet;
the Orge flows from West to East past the South of the town.

Climate

Épinay-sur-Orge has a oceanic climate (Köppen climate classification Cfb).

History
The area of Épinay-sur-Orge was inhabited from prehistoric times. The town is first mentioned in a 9th-century document as Spinetum. Traces of habitations from the Middle Ages have been found at Breuil (in the South) and Petit Vaux (West of the present-day centre). Slowly, such clusters of building grew towards one agricultural settlement. The town was created in 1793.  In May 1843, the development of the town received a boost from becoming a stop on the Paris-Orléans railway, now the main RER station. In the Franco-Prussian War, the Prussians executed 4 resistance fighters in Épinay. A monument to them is in the town cemetery.  On 23 August 1944, Épinay was liberated by the "group Warabiot" of the 2nd armoured division (the division Leclerc) on its way from Argentan to Paris. On 21 January 1945, the city decided to rename the rue de Montlhéry, henceforth known as the rue de la Division Leclerc.

Population
The inhabitants of Épinay are known as Spinoliens.

Sights
Épinay-sur-Orge was long known for its system of market gardens, providing Parisians with fresh vegetables. The gardens were irrigated with a system of locks in the rivers. Only one of these remains. To the south-east of the town is the psychiatric hospital "Vaucluse". The building was the expatriate home of a rich Irishman who left it to the Départment of the Essonne in 1863 on the condition that it be turned into an "asylum for the mad". Reconstruction was finished in 1865. In 1869 the hospital opened with a capacity of around 1000 patients. At that time, the town had a population of 587. Patients built the tower on the grounds, as this was considered therapeutic. There is a long history of conflict between the hospital and the town over the high water level, caused by the river locks, which eroded the land of the hospital and flooded the patients' gardens.

Another monument is the town hall, originally the palace of the Duchess Carafa de Noja. After her death in 1923, the town bought the building and surrounding park. This finally allowed the construction of a fresh water supply system (1923) and electrification (1925). The grand avenue leading towards the palace is still clearly recognizable, with cherry trees blooming in spring.

See also
Communes of the Essonne department

References

External links

 Épinay-sur-Orge commune website (in French)

Mayors of Essonne Association 

Communes of Essonne